Queens of the Breakers is the third studio album by Canadian trio The Barr Brothers. It was released in October 13, 2017 through Secret City Records.

Accolades

Track listing

Charts

References

2017 albums
Secret City Records albums